Rubina Ashraf is a Pakistani actress, director and producer. Rubina appeared in PTV classic dramas such as Kasak, Hazaroon Rastay, Sirriyan, Tapish and Badaltey Mausam. She also appeared in dramas including Khuda Aur Muhabbat Season 3, Uraan, Gul-e-Rana and Do Bol.

Early life and education
Rubina was born on 9 November 1960 in Lahore, Pakistan. She completed her studies from University of Lahore and she graduated with a degree in graphic designing.

Career

Acting
Rubina started her acting career in 1980 when she was visiting PTV Lahore Centre with her friends and there actress Sahira Kazmi cast her in a drama. Then she worked in multiple dramas including Pas-e-Aaina, Tapish, Badaltey Mausam,  Kasak and Sirriyan on PTV.

Drama directing
Rubina directing many dramas including Vaani which received good reviews in 2008 and directed dramas Surkh Chandni, Ek Adh Hafta, Tarazoo and Tere Siwa. Then Rubina diracted drama Shikwa in 2014. In 2020 Rubina directed drama Ruswai which became a hit drama.

Personal life
Rubina married Tariq Mirza and has two children a son and actress Minna Tariq is her daughter. She was diagnosed with COVID-19 during the COVID-19 pandemic in Pakistan and went into quarantine then she recoverd.

Filmography

Television series
{|class="wikitable"
! Year
! Title
! Role
! Notes
|-
| 1986
| Hazaroon Rastay
| Mishal Qadir
| PTV
|-
| 1988
| Sirriyan
| Shehnaz
| PTV
|-
| 1989
| Junoon
| Baaima
| PTV
|-
| 1989
| Tapish
| Sara 
| PTV
|-
| 1990
| Kacha Ghara
| Lubna
| PTV
|-
| 1992
| Kasak
| Sabreena
| PTV
|-
| 1992
| Pas-e-Aaina
| Madame Sahiba
| PTV
|-
| 1992
| Badaltey Mausam
|  Imrana
| PTV
|-
| 1994
| She Jee
| Hareem Ahmed
| NTM
|-
| 1997
| Sawan Roop
| Farah
| PTV
|-
| 1998
| Drama Hee Drama
| Shiza
| PTV
|-
| 2002
| Tere Siwa
| Saima
| PTV
|-
| 2005
| Aik Aadh Hafta
| Khalida
| PTV
|-
| 2008
| Faiz Manzil ke Rozadar
| Bano
| PTV
|-
| 2008
| Mujhe Apna Bana Lo
| Priya's mother
| Hum TV
|-
| 2009
| Abhi Door Hai Kinara
| Arslan's mother
| PTV
|-
| 2009
| Band Khirkyon Kay Peechay (season 1)
| Shafaq
|
|-
| 2009
| Ishq Ki Inteha
| Bakhtawar's mmother
|
|-
| 2009
| Tanveer Fatima (B.A)
| Sidra
|
|-
| 2010
| Yariyan
| Babar's mother
|
|-
| 2010
| Tumhe Kuch Yaad Hai Jaana
| Mahnoor's mother
|
|-
| 2010
| Morr Uss Gali Ka
| Maryam
|
|-
| 2011
| Mera Naseeb
| Shazia's mother
| 
|-
| 2011
| Akhri Barish
| Saira
| 
|-
| 2011
| Band Khirkyon Kay Peechay (season 2)
| Shafaq
|
|-
| 2011
| Mujhay Roothnay Na Daina
| Nafeesa
|
|-
| 2011
| Aurat Ka Ghar Kona
| Iffat Aara
|
|-
| 2012
| Behkawa| Maya's mother
|
|-
| 2012
| Maseeha| Abish's mother
|
|-
| 2012
| Talafi| Surayya
|
|-
| 2012
| Raju Rocket| Sameen's mother
|
|-
| 2012
| Hisar E Ishq| Begm Sahiba
|
|-
| 2013
| Parchaiyan| Saliha
| ARY Digital
|-
| 2013
| Matam| Ayla
|
|-
| 2013
| Halki Si Khalish| Rania's mother
|
|-
| 2014
| Kissey Apna Kahein| Zainab
|
|-
| 2014
| Dil Nahi Manta| Shahana
|
|-
| 2015
| Kitna Satatay Ho| Rabia's mother
|
|-
| 2015
| Gul-e-Rana| Muniraa
|
|-
| 2016
| Hatheli| Naheed
|
|-
| 2016
| Manjdhaar| Saleema
|
|-
| 2016
| Dil Haari| Muqaddas's mother
|
|-
| 2017
| Be Inteha| Khadija
| Urdu 1
|-
| 2017
| Main Maa Nahi Banna Chahti| Jibran's mother
|
|-
| 2017
| Iltija| Sameer's mother
| ARY Digital
|-
| 2018
| Ustani Jee| Kiran's mother
| Hum TV
|-
| 2018
| Lamhay| Rukshana's mother
| A-Plus
|-
| 2018
| Ru Baru Ishq Tha| Riffat Ara
|
|-
| 2019
| Do Bol| Qudsia
|
|-
| 2019
| Choti Choti Batain - Roop| Faryal
|
|-
| 2019
| Rishtay Biktay Hain| Khalida
|
|-
| 2020
| Uraan| Baaji
|
|-
| 2020
| Makafaat Season 2| Asif's aunt 
| Geo Entertainment
|-
| 2021
| Khuda Aur Muhabbat Season 3| Bari Sarkar
|
|-
| 2022
| Dil Zaar Zaar| Tani
|
|-
| 2022
| Angna| Sania
|
|-
| 2022
| Aik Sitam Aur| Naeema
|
|-
| 2022
| Zakham| Saleha
| Geo Entertainment
|-
| 2022
| Oye Motti Season 2| Aiza's mother
| Express Entertainment
|}

Telefilm

Film

Director
 Ruswai Vaani Shikwa Surkh Chandni Tere Siwa Ek Adh Hafta Tarazoo''

Awards and nominations

References

External links 
 
 
 Rubina Ashraf at the tv.com.pk

1960 births
20th-century Pakistani actresses
Living people
Actresses from Lahore
Actresses from Karachi
Pakistani television actresses
Pakistani television producers
Pakistani graphic designers
Pakistani stage actresses
21st-century Pakistani actresses
Women television producers
Women graphic designers
Pakistani film actresses